Esther Bick, (1902–1983), born in Przemyśl, Galicia, Poland (then part of the Austro-Hungarian Empire), was a psychologist and child and adult psychoanalyst who, with Dr. John Bowlby, established the child and adolescent psychotherapy training program at the Tavistock Clinic, London, in 1948.

Biography 
Estera Lifsa Wander was born the oldest daughter in an orthodox Jewish family in Poland. She studied in Vienna with Charlotte Bühler and completed her doctorate in 1935. After graduation, she married a medical student Philipp Bick (1904-?); the couple had fled Austria to Switzerland together after the Anschluss, the annexation of Austria into Nazi Germany in 1938. Because she could not get a work permit there, she went to England, without her husband, as a refugee. Most of her family that remained in Poland died later in Nazi concentration camps. She settled in Manchester, working in nurseries during the war.

Research 
In 1948 she was invited by John Bowlby to head a child psychotherapy training at the Tavistock Clinic, which had just joined the new British National Health Service. Bick would continue to head the organization until 1960.

She is known for developing the method of psychoanalytic infant observation. Her discovery of the potential of infant observation undertaken within the child's home over the first year or two of life became the foundation of the growth of a psychoanalytic perspective within the observer. It was a conceptual innovation in the history of child and later adult psychoanalytic training and was pioneered in Italy by child neuropsychiatrist Marcella Balconi. It has since become an essential feature of pre-clinical training in child and adult psychotherapy, psychoanalysis and related fields throughout the world.

Selected works 
 "Notes on Infant Observation in Psycho-Analytic Training", The International Journal of Psycho-Analysis, 1964, vol.  45, no. 4, p.  558–566.
 Notes on the observation of babies in the training of analysts, Journal of Child Psychoanalysis, p. 14-35, no. 12, 1992 “The observation of the baby.”
 Notes on the observation of babies in the training of psychoanalysts, in Myriam Boubli and Laurent Danon-Boileau (eds.), Le bébé en psychanalyse, Puf, 2014, coll. “Monographs and debates in psychoanalysis”,, trad. Maurice Despinoy & Laurent Danon-Boileau, p. 13–36.
 The experience of the skin in early object relationships, in Donald Meltzer (ed.), Explorations dans le monde de autisme, Paris, Payot, 1980, trad. Geneviève and Michel Haag, p. 240–244.
 Further considerations on the functioning of skin in early object relations: findings from infant observation integrated into child and adult analysis, Brit.J.Psychother., II, 1986, p. 292-299.

See also 
 Psychoanalytic Infant Observation

References

Bibliography 
 Psychoanalytikerinnen. Biografisches Lexikon: http://www.psychoanalytikerinnen.de/greatbritain_biographies.html#Bick
 Melanie Klein Trust. Esther Bick: http://www.melanie-klein-trust.org.uk/bick
 Margaret Rustin, "Esther Bick's legacy of infant observation at the Tavistock - some reflections 60 years on", International Journal of Infant Observation and Its Applications, Vol. 12, Issue 1, 2009. DOI: https://dx.doi.org/10.1080/13698030902731691

1902 births
1983 deaths
People from Przemyśl
British psychoanalysts
British women psychiatrists
English psychiatrists
20th-century Polish Jews
Polish women psychiatrists
Jewish psychiatrists
Jewish psychoanalysts
Polish emigrants to the United Kingdom